Aygeshat or Aigeshat may refer to:
Aygeshat, Armavir, Armenia
Aygeshat, Echmiadzin, Armenia